Motorbass was a French house duo originating from Paris and consisting of Philippe Zdar (later of Cassius) and Étienne de Crécy. According to AllMusic, their "romping '70s updates released on the Cassius and Source labels have been instrumental in reviving the Parisian underground dance music scene and bringing to it international attention."

Discography 
 Studio albums

 Pansoul (1996)

References 

French house music groups
Musical groups from Paris